Anthony Warner may refer to:

 Anthony Warner (chef) (born 1973), chef and food writer
 Anthony Quinn Warner (1957–2020), perpetrator of the 2020 Nashville bombing
 Tony Warner (born 1974), footballer